HNoMS Ellida was a Royal Norwegian Navy corvette first commissioned 16 May 1849. 
Cordt Holtermann Valeur was her first commander. The ship was used as a cadet-ship until 1864 and sold in 1866.

Sources
Norwegian Navy history page

Corvettes of the Royal Norwegian Navy
Ships built in Horten